The following is a timeline of the history of the city of Philadelphia, Pennsylvania.

17th-18th centuries
 1682 – Philadelphia founded as capital of the English Crown Province of Pennsylvania by William Penn.
 1689 – William Penn Charter School founded.
 1691 – Appointment of first mayor, Humphrey Morrey, by Penn.
 1700 – Swedish Lutheran Gloria Dei Church consecrated.
 1710 – Town Hall built.
 1711 – Trinity Church built.
 1719 – American Weekly Mercury newspaper begins publication.
 1722 – James Logan becomes mayor.
 1728
 Pennsylvania Gazette newspaper begins publication.
 Printer Benjamin Franklin in business.
 1731 – Library Company of Philadelphia established
 1735 – Pennsylvania State House built.
 1736 – Union Fire Company formed
 1740 – Kahal Kadosh Mikveh Israel founded.
 1742
 The Pennsylvania Journal newspaper begins publication.
 October: Philadelphia Election Riot.
 1743 – Philosophical Society founded.
 1744 – Christ Church built.
 1745 – New Market built.
 1749 – Academy of Philadelphia founded.
 1751
 Street lighting begins.
 Pennsylvania Hospital founded.
 1753 – Bell hung in tower of State House.
 1755 – College of Philadelphia chartered.
 1757 – Amicable Library Co. founded.
 1766 
 American Society for Promoting Useful Knowledge established.
 Foundation of the city's first permanent theatre, the Southwark Theatre in Philadelphia.
 1767
 January 6: Pennsylvania Chronicle newspaper begins publication.
 November: Dickinson's Letters from a Farmer in Pennsylvania begin publication.
 New Circulating Library in business.
 1769 – American Philosophical Society formed.
 1771
 Carpenters' Hall in use.
 Pennsylvania Packet newspaper begins publication.
 Friendly Sons of Saint Patrick founded.
 1773 – Walnut Street Jail in operation.
 1774
 First Troop Philadelphia City Cavalry organized.
 September 5: First Continental Congress of the United Colonies begins meeting in Carpenters' Hall.
 1775
 April 14: Pennsylvania Abolition Society founded.
 May 10: Second Continental Congress of the Thirteen Colonies begins.
 July 6: Second Continental Congress issues Declaration of the Causes and Necessity of Taking Up Arms.
 Samuel Powel becomes mayor.
 The United States Marine Corps founded in Tun Tavern.
 1776
 January 10: Thomas Paine's Common Sense published.
 July 4: United States Declaration of Independence signed in the Pennsylvania State House.
 December 12: threat of British occupation of Philadelphia prompts Congress to move to Baltimore (Henry Fite House) for two months
 1777 
 March 5: Congress returns to Philadelphia.
 September 11: British victory at the Battle of Brandywine forces Congress to flee from Philadelphia to Lancaster, and then York. Pro-Revolutionary civilians flee as well.
 September 23: British troops occupy Philadelphia, greeted by Loyalist civilians.
 1778 
 June 18: British troops abandon Philadelphia in order to defend New York City; Continental forces retake Philadelphia the same day.
 July 2: Congress returns to Philadelphia.
 1781
 March 1: Congress of the Confederation replaces Second Continental Congress.
 The Religious Society of Free Quakers founded.
 1783 
 June 20: Pennsylvania Mutiny of 1783.
 June 22: Congress flees to Princeton, New Jersey, due to the Pennsylvania Munity.
 1784
 Charles Willson Peale's Philadelphia Museum founded.
 Dock Street laid out.
 1785 – Philadelphia Society for Promoting Agriculture instituted.
 1786
 Labor strike by printers.
 Philadelphia Dispensary established.
 1787
 May–September: U.S. Constitutional Convention held.
 College of Physicians, Free African Society, and Philadelphia Society for Alleviating the Miseries of Public Prisons founded.
 1790
 November: George Washington moves into President's House on High Street.
 December 6: United States capital relocates to Philadelphia from New York City for a period of 10 years as the new national capital is constructed at Washington, D.C.
 Philadelphia Stock Exchange founded.
 General Advertiser newspaper begins publication.
 Population: 28,522.
 1791
 City Hall building constructed; U.S. Supreme Court convenes.
 University of Pennsylvania established.
 1792
 Philadelphia Medical Society incorporated.
 Philadelphia Mint building constructed.
 Construction started for the new President's House on Ninth Street.
 1793 – Yellow Fever Epidemic.
 1794
 Mother Bethel African Methodist Episcopal Church, Society for the Information and Assistance of Emigrants, and Byberry Library established.
 1798 – Bank of the United States opens.
 1800 – United States capital relocates from Philadelphia to Washington, D.C.

19th century

1800s-1840s
 1801
 Chamber of Commerce established.
 St. Augustine Church built.
 The Port Folio magazine begins publication.
 1802
 University of Pennsylvania starts classes in the President's House at its Ninth Street Campus.
 1805
 Pennsylvania Academy of the Fine Arts founded.
 Arch Street Friends Meeting House built.
 1806 – U.S. Supreme Court decides Commonwealth v. Pullis, criminalizing labor strikes.
 1807 – First African Presbyterian Church founded.
 1809 – First African Baptist Church founded.
 1810
 Columbian Garden opens on Market Street.
 Population: 53,722.
 1811 – Girard Bank founded.
 1812
Colossus Bridge built near city.
Wooden pipes installed to carry water through the city.
 Pennsylvania's capital moved to Harrisburg.
 1813 – Analectic Magazine begins publication.
 1814 – Athenaeum of Philadelphia founded.
 1816 – African Methodist Episcopal Church (denomination) and Philadelphia Saving Fund Society founded.
 1817 – Academy of Natural Sciences incorporated.
 1820 – Apprentices' Library Company founded.                                 Joseph Bonaparte marriage to Ann Savage society hill established                             
 1821 – Mercantile Library Company and Philadelphia College of Pharmacy established.
 1822
 Chestnut Street Theatre built.
 Volunteer Corps of Light Infantry and Southwark Library established.
 1824
 Historical Society of Pennsylvania and Franklin Institute and American Sunday School Union established.
 1825 - Erie Canal opened.
 1826 – The Casket magazine begins publication.
 1827 – Pennsylvania Horticultural Society established.
 1828 – Register of Pennsylvania begins publication.
 1829
 Pennsylvania Inquirer newspaper begins publication.
 Eastern State Penitentiary built.
 1830 – Population: 80,462.
 September: first national colored convention at Mother Bethel A.M.E. Church, Philadelphia
 1831
 June: first annual Convention of the People of Color at the Wesleyan Church, Philadelphia
 Baldwin Locomotive Works and Philadelphia Glee Association established.
 1833 
 August: third annual Convention for the Improvement of the Free People of Color, Philadelphia
 December: American Anti-Slavery Society organized.
 1834 – Philadelphia and Columbia Railroad and Merchants' Exchange Building constructed.
 1835 – June: 1835 Philadelphia general strike.
 1836 – Public Ledger newspaper begins publication.
 1837
 Institute for Colored Youth founded.
 Ladies' Garland magazine and Burton's Gentleman's Magazine begin publication.
 1842
 Lombard Street Riot.
 Augustinian College of Vilanova founded near city.
 1844 – May–July: Philadelphia Nativist Riots.
 1845 – American Literary Union organized.
 1848
 Philadelphia School of Design for Women founded.
 Girard College opens.
 St. Augustine Church rebuilt.

1850s-1890s
 1850 – Population: 121,376.
 1852 – AME Christian Recorder newspaper begins publication.
 1854
 October: National Women's Rights Convention held.
 City expands to encompass all of Philadelphia County, including: Aramingo Borough, Belmont District, Blockley Township, Bridesburg Borough, Bristol Township, Byberry Township, Delaware Township, Frankford Borough, Germantown Borough, Germantown Township, Kensington District, Kingsessing Township, Lower Dublin Township, Manayunk Borough, Moreland Township, Moyamensing District, Northern Liberties District, Northern Liberties Township, Oxford Township, Passyunk Township, Penn District, Penn Township, Philadelphia City, Roxborough Township, Richmond District, Southwark District, Spring Garden District, West Philadelphia Borough, and Whitehall Borough.
 YMCA Philadelphia and Western Library Association of Philadelphia founded.
 1855 – Girard Avenue Bridge built.
 1856 – June: Republican National Convention held.
 1857
 Academy of Music building constructed.
 Library & Reading Room Assoc. founded.
 1858 – Mütter Museum established.
 1860
 June 9: Japanese embassy arrives.
 Philadelphia Sketch Club organized.
 Population: 565,529.
McGillin's Olde Ale House opened on Drury Street. McGillin's is the oldest continuously operating tavern in Philadelphia and one of the oldest in the country.
 1862
 Photographic Society of Philadelphia and Union League of Philadelphia founded.
 William Cramp & Sons shipbuilders in business.
 1864
 Pennsylvania Equal Rights League headquartered in city.
 Philadelphia Photographer magazine begins publication.
 Cathedral Basilica of Saints Peter and Paul built.
 June: Sanitary Fair held.
 1865
 Benjamin Guggenheim  was an American businessman who was born in Philadelphia and died aboard     when the ship sank in the North Atlantic Ocean. His body was never recovered.
 1866
 August: National Union Convention held.
 Birely, Hillman & Streaker (shipbuilders) and Green's Hotel in business.
 Chestnut Street Bridge opens.
 1868 – Strawbridge & Clothier in business.
 1869
 Knights of Labor established.
 N.W. Ayer in business.
 1870 – Population: 674,022.
 1873
 Philadelphia Fire Department established.
 Masonic Temple built.
 Dutrieuille caterers in business.
 1874 – Philadelphia Zoo opens.
 1876
 May 10: Centennial International Exhibition opens.
 Workingmen's Party of America founded in Philadelphia.
 1877 – Pennsylvania Museum and School of Industrial Art opens.
 1878 – October 24: Storm.
 1882
 Philadelphia Association of Textile Manufacturers formed.
 October - Celebration of the bi-centennial of the landing of William Penn.
 1883 – Philadelphia Phillies baseball team formed.
 1884
 Starr Centre founded.
 Post Office opens on 9th Street.
 1887 – September: U.S. Constitution centennial.
 1890
 Mother Bethel A.M.E. Church built.
 Population: 1,046,964.
 Frankford Camera Club organized.

 1891
December 17: Drexel University is founded. 
Free Library of Philadelphia and Geographical Club of Philadelphia established.

 1892
 Electric trolley begins operating.
 Genealogical Society of Pennsylvania founded.
 1893
 Reading Terminal station opens.
 Wilstach Gallery opens in West Fairmount Park.
 1897 – American Negro Historical Society and Berean Manual Training and Industrial School established.
 1898 – October: Peace Jubilee held.
 1899 – Penn Museum building constructed.
 1900
 June: 1900 Republican National Convention held.
 Philadelphia Orchestra founded.
 North American Building constructed.
 Population: 1,293,697.

20th century

1900s-1940s

 1902
 Automat eatery in business.
 Corn Exchange National Bank building constructed.
 1901 – Philadelphia City Hall built.
 1903 – Textile strike.
 1905 – City Club of Philadelphia chartered.
 1907 
 Broad Street Subway begins operation.
 March 7: Market Street Subway begins operation. 
 1908 - Celebration of the 225th anniversary of the foundation of the city.
 1909 – Bureau of Municipal Research established.
 1910
 Philadelphia general strike (1910).
 Population: 1,549,008.
 1914 – Empress Theater and Christian Street YMCA open.
 1915 
 Martin Nodell was born in Philadelphia.
 South 9th Street Italian Market chartered
 1917 – American Stores Company in business.
 1918 
 September 19: The Spanish Flu hits through the Philadelphia Navy Yard from sailors returning from Europe
 September 28: Liberty Loan Parade leads to explosion of influenza 
 October: Spanish flu explodes in Philadelphia killing 12,000 and sickening over 48,000
 1919
 July: Racial unrest.
 Aero Service Corporation in business.
 1920
 Colored Dunbar Theatre built (approximate date).
 Population: 1,823,779.
 1921 – Municipal piers built on Delaware River.
 1923 – Philadelphia trolley bus (trackless trolley) system opens.
 1924 – Curtis Institute of Music established.
 1925 – Philadelphia Daily News begins publication.
 1926
 Roosevelt Theatre and Benjamin Franklin Bridge to Camden, New Jersey, open.
 May 31: Sesquicentennial Exposition opens.
 1927
 Philadelphia Municipal Airport dedicated.
 Parkway Central Library opens.
 1928
 Forrest Theatre and Boyd Theatre open.
 Philadelphia Museum of Art building constructed.
 1929
 Uptown Theater opens.
 Rodin Museum dedicated.
 1930 – Population: 1,950,961.
 1931
 Municipal Auditorium opens.
 Girard Trust Building constructed.
 Philadelphia Society for the Preservation of Landmarks founded.
 1932
 Philadelphia Saving Fund Society Building constructed.
 Market Street Bridge rebuilt.
 1933
 Pennsylvania Station–30th Street opens.
 Philadelphia Eagles NFL team founded.
 1935 – United States Post Office-Main Branch built.
 1936 – Democratic National Convention held.
 1937 – Philadelphia Housing Authority established.
 1938 – Jack and Jill (organization) founded.
 1940
 Philadelphia Transportation Company begins operation, replacing the Philadelphia Rapid Transit Company
 Population: 1,931,334.
 Philadelphia International Airport opens. 
 1941 – Philadelphia History Museum dedicated.
 1943 – September 6: Frankford Junction train wreck.
 1944 – August: Philadelphia transit strike of 1944.
 1945 – Philadelphia Northeast Airport opens.
 1946
 University of Pennsylvania's ENIAC computer introduced.
 Links women's club founded.
 1948 – June: 1948 Republican National Convention held.
 1949 – Philadelphia Textile Institute established.

1950s-2000s

 1950
 Philadelphia Civic Grand Opera Company active.
 Population: 2,071,605.
 1952 – Philadelphia City Archives established.
 1955 – Philadelphia Historical Commission and Foreign Policy Research Institute established.
 1956 – Independence National Historical Park established.
 1958
 Philadelphia Lyric Opera Company active.
 Japanese House and Garden installed in West Fairmount Park.
 Robert Nix becomes U.S. representative for Pennsylvania's 4th congressional district.
 1963 – Syracuse Nationals move to Philadelphia and become the 76ers.
 1964
 August: 1964 Philadelphia race riot.
 Society Hill Towers built.
 Sister city relationship established with Florence, Italy.
 1965
 JFK Plaza constructed.
 Delaware Valley Regional Planning Commission and Society Hill Civic Association formed.
 1966 – Sister city relationship established with Tel Aviv, Israel.
 1967
 Temple University's Urban Archives (of Philadelphia) established.
 Philadelphia Flyers NHL team founded.
 1968
SEPTA takes over the Philadelphia Transportation Company
Philadelphia Boys Choir founded.
 1970
 September: Revolutionary People's Constitutional Convention held in city.
 Le Bec-Fin restaurant in business.
 Population: 1,948,609.
 1971 – Mariposa Food Co-op established.
 1972
 Frank Rizzo becomes mayor.
 One Meridian Plaza built.
 1974 – Philadelphia Green launched.
 1975
 August: 1975 Philadelphia Refinery Fire.
 Opera Company of Philadelphia formed.
 1976
 African American Museum in Philadelphia and National Museum of American Jewish History established.
 Gray's Ferry Bridge opens.
 Sister city relationship established with Toruń, Poland.
 1977 – The Gallery at Market East shopping mall opens.
 1980
 Population: 1,688,210.
 March 21: Angelo Bruno assassinated outside his home. The murder was orchestrated by his consigliere, Antonio Caponigro, who was unhappy with Bruno's conservative leadership style and had been led to believe that, if he attempted a coup, he would have the support of the Genovese crime family. That April, Caponigro visited New York City, apparently under the assumption he was about to be confirmed as boss. Instead, he was tortured and murdered.
 Sister city relationship established with Tianjin, China.
 Philadelphia Phillies win the World Series.
 1981 – Philadelphia City Paper begins publication.
 1983 – SEPTA Regional Rail begins operating.
 1984
 Market East Station (now Jefferson Station) and Center City Commuter Connection open.
 Ashram established by Prakashanand Saraswati.
 Sister city relationship established with Incheon, South Korea.
 1985 – The MOVE bombing in West Philadelphia kills 11 people and destroys about 60 homes.
 1986
 Sister city relationship established with Douala, Cameroon.
 1987
 One Liberty Place built.
 The Roots (band) formed.
 1989 – Dock Street Brewing Company pub in business.
 1990 – Population: 1,585,577.
 1992
 First Friday begins in Old Town.
 Sister city relationship established with Nizhny Novgorod, Russia.
 1992 – Ed Rendell becomes mayor of Philadelphia.
 1993 – Pennsylvania Convention Center opens.
 1995 – Chaka Fattah becomes Pennsylvania's 2nd congressional district representative.
 1996
 City website online (approximate date).
 Wilma Theater and CoreStates Center (arena) open.
 1997 – October 25: National Million Woman March held in city.
 1998 – Bob Brady becomes Pennsylvania's 1st congressional district representative.
 2000
 May 18: Philadelphia Pier 34 collapse.
 December 28: Lex Street massacre.
 John F. Street becomes mayor.
 Republican National Convention held in Philadelphia.
 Population: 1,517,550.

21st century

 2001 – Kimmel Center for the Performing Arts opens.
 2003 - Lincoln Financial Field opens. 
 2004
 Iraq Veterans Against the War headquartered in Philadelphia.
 Citizens Bank Park opens.
 2005 –
 July 2: Live 8, a worldwide concert takes places on the Benjamin Franklin Parkway. Over 600 thousand people attended. 
 July 4: Philadelphia Freedom Concert held.
 September 4: SEPTA gains its first heritage trolley line, route 15. The route is operated by rebuilt street cars from the late 40's
 2008
 Michael Nutter becomes mayor.
 Comcast Center built.
 The Philadelphia Phillies defeat the Tampa Bay Rays to win the 2008 World Series.
 2010 – Population: 1,526,006; metro 5,965,343.
 2011
 October: Occupy Philadelphia begins.
 Population: 1,536,471; metro 5,992,414.
 2012
 City open data and government transparency order enacted.
 Barnes Foundation relocates to the Parkway.
 2013 
 June 5: Building collapse in Center City.
 2015
 May 12: 2015 Philadelphia train derailment.
 September: Pope Francis' visit to the United States, concluding with the visit to Philadelphia, for the 2015 World Meeting of Families.
 2016
 January 4: Jim Kenney becomes mayor of Philadelphia.
 July: 2016 Democratic National Convention held in city.
 2018 
 February 4: The Philadelphia Eagles defeat the New England Patriots 41–33 to win Super Bowl LII, their first Super Bowl win.
 July 2018: Comcast Innovation and Technology Center opens.
 2019 
 September 19: The Fashion District Philadelphia opens at the site of The Gallery at Market East.
 2020
 March 2020: Philadelphia was hardest-hit by COVID-19 pandemic, which put few thousands of residents out of work, and shifted others to work at home.
 October 26: Walter Wallace a black man in Philadelphia is killed by police and rioting starts on the day of his death.
 2021
 January 20: Joe Biden becomes the first President of the United States from the Greater Philadelphia Area
 October 13: Woman raped on SEPTA train, perceived delayed response by bystanders sparks debate.
 2022 
 January 5: Thirteen people die and two others are injured in a fire at a converted apartment complex in the Fairmount neighborhood of Philadelphia.
 June 5: A mass shooting occurs on South street which results in the deaths of 3 and injury of 11.

See also

 History of Philadelphia
 List of mayors of Philadelphia
 Philadelphia Register of Historic Places
 National Register of Historic Places listings in Philadelphia, Pennsylvania
 History of rail transport in Philadelphia
 Sister city timelines: Aix-en-Provence, Douala, Florence, Frankfurt, Kobe, Nizhny Novgorod, Tel Aviv
 Timelines of other cities in Pennsylvania: Pittsburgh
Timeline of women's suffrage in Pennsylvania
Pennsylvania State Equal Rights League Convention

References

Bibliography

External links

 
  (online database of maps and photos, searchable by time period)
 , c. 1777–1943
 Items related to Philadelphia, various dates (via Digital Public Library of America)
 Items related to Philadelphia, various dates (via Europeana)

Philadelphia-related lists
 
Philadelphia
Years in Pennsylvania